Spruce Mountain High School is a public high school located in Jay, Maine, United States. It serves students from Jay, Livermore, and Livermore Falls, Maine.

Incorporation
Spruce Mountain High School was founded when Livermore Falls High School and Jay High School combined as the result of the consolidation between RSU #36 and the Jay School Department in 2011.

Mascot and colors
The colors, the mascot, and the name of Spruce Mountain High School were chosen by high school and middle school students of Livermore Falls and Jay. The Phoenix was chosen as the consolidated high school's mascot to represent the end of a long-standing rivalry and the new chapter in the history of all three communities. The name Spruce Mountain comes from Spruce Mountain located in Jay, Maine. Spruce Mountain is home to a popular local ski slope enjoyed by students and residents of all three towns in the winter, making it an appropriate name for the school.

Campus consolidation

2011–2012
In the first year of consolidation, middle school students in RSU 73 all attended Spruce Mountain Middle School, in the building formerly occupied by Jay Middle School. High School students, though technically attending the same school, remained in separate buildings (Spruce Mountain High School at South and North Campuses).

2012–2013
Because splitting up a class after consolidation was deemed detrimental, the first consolidated eighth grade class was kept together and put at North Campus their ninth grade year, even though grades 10 through 12 were still separate. During this second school year, and throughout the consolidation process, multiple solutions were discussed for fully consolidating the High School. Among them was a five million dollar addition to North Campus, which was rejected by voters in May 2012. In November of 2012, voters approved an almost two million dollar renovation to North Campus and Spruce Mountain Middle School, including a connector between the two, in order to accommodate students from all three member towns.

2013-2014
The renovation complete, Spruce Mountain High School opened for the first time as one school in the fall of 2013.

References

Educational institutions established in 2011
Public high schools in Maine
Schools in Androscoggin County, Maine
Schools in Franklin County, Maine
2011 establishments in Maine
Jay, Maine